Leptopelis mossambicus, the brown-backed tree frog, Mozambique tree frog or Mossambique forest treefrog, is a species of frog in the family Arthroleptidae found in Eswatini, Malawi, Mozambique, South Africa, Zimbabwe, and possibly Botswana.
Its natural habitats are dry savanna, moist savanna, subtropical or tropical moist shrubland, subtropical or tropical dry lowland grasslands, subtropical or tropical seasonally wet or flooded lowland grasslands, swamps, freshwater marshes, and intermittent freshwater marshes.
It is threatened by habitat loss.

References

Leptopelis
Taxonomy articles created by Polbot
Amphibians described in 1985